Cymindis ephippium is a species of ground beetle in the subfamily Harpalinae. It was described by Escalera in 1914.

References

ephippium
Beetles described in 1914